Sinarades is a town in the northern part of the island of Corfu, Greece, part of the municipal unit of Parelioi.  In 2011 its population was 854 for the village and 920 for the community, which includes the small villages Aspes and Kontogialos. It is the largest village of Parelioi. Sinarades is located southwest of the city of Corfu.

Population

See also
List of settlements in the Corfu regional unit

References

External links
Sidari Online Gallery 
Sinarades at the GTP Travel Pages

Populated places in Corfu (regional unit)